One Way Ticket is a 1994 album by Luciano.

CD information
Format: Compact Disc (05464513862)
Release Date: December 22, 1994
Original release year: 1995
Engineer: Paul & Murphy
Guest Artists: Lady G; Charlie Chaplin; Sly Dunbar; Cocoa Tea
Stereo: Stereo
Pieces in Set: 1
Catalog #: VP1386
Desc: Performer

Track listing
 "Black Survivor"
 "Chant Down Babylon"
 "One Way Ticket"
 "Ragamuffin"
 "Bounty Lover" (with Lady G)
 "Jah Is Alive" (with Charlie Chaplin)
 "Nature Boy"
 "Turn Your Life Around"
 "Throw Out The Life Line"
 "Give Thanks"
 "That's The Way Life Goes"
 "Some Sweet Day"
 "Mr. Governor" (with Cocoa Tea)
 "Jah"

References

1994 albums
Luciano (singer) albums